Oregon State University's College of Liberal Arts is a liberal arts college at Oregon State University, a public research university in Corvallis, Oregon. It is the second largest of the 12 colleges at the university and offers 66 academic programs.

Coursework is offered at the university's main campus in Corvallis, at the Oregon State University Cascades Campus in Bend, and online via OSU's Ecampus. As of fall 2022, the college maintains six schools, employs 290 faculty members, and claims an enrollment of just over 4,400 students.

Schools
Communication
History, Philosophy and Religion
Psychological Science
Public Policy
Visual, Performing and Design Arts
Writing, Literature and Film

History

Oregon State University first offered college-level coursework in liberal arts as early as 1868. Since then, the university has provided students with a wide range of liberal arts courses and degrees. Starting in the late 1800s, however, advancements developed during the American Industrial Revolution introduced students to new career opportunities in the sciences and technology. A reduced interest in the liberal arts and a new state policy, requiring the university to focus curricula on the sciences and technology, forced administrators to de-emphasize liberal arts as a major in 1914 and over the subsequent four decades. Still, courses in the liberal arts remained an important part of the required core for all majors and were offered as popular electives and select majors throughout this period. 

During World War II, courses in liberal arts began to grow in popularity again. By the 1950s, students were demanding degrees in liberal arts to work in the growing number of liberal art professions. In 1959, then university president, A.L. Strand created the first divisional majors in humanities and social sciences.

In 1961, the university added the School of Humanities and Social Sciences. Courses in liberal arts continued to grow in popularity through the 1960s and, by 1973, OSU formalized these schools under a college of liberal arts. Early schools included humanities, social sciences and fine-and-performing arts.

The first graduate degrees were offered by the college's scientific and technical communications school in 1988. However, doctorates in philosophy and other liberal arts were first offered as early as the 1930s, before being incorporated into the college. 

Today, the college of liberal arts makes up one of the largest colleges on campus and claims a number of notable alumni and faculty.

Academics
Oregon State University's College of Liberal Arts offers a wide range of majors, minors, and concentrations within its six schools. In 2022, the college offered over 66 academic programs across four campuses. In 2021, U.S. News & World Report ranked the college's online psychology school second in the nation. Over the last seven years, U.S. News & World Report also ranked OSU's Ecampus in the top 10 in the nation for online bachelor’s programs, of which, nearly a quarter of those online classes are offered through the college of liberal arts.

U.S. News & World Report ranked several college of liberal arts schools as a combined 226th amongst global universities in 2021. U.S. News & World Report no longer provides rankings for all schools within a college of liberal arts at "global" universities. Instead, the ranking publication only ranks a select number of "social science and public health" schools offered within these colleges. The most common schools used in their rankings were limited to criminology and criminal justice, English, history, political science and sociology. In 2021, the college of liberal arts at OSU included six schools and over 20 majors.

Measure 5
In 1990, Oregon voters passed the historic property-tax reducing Ballot Measure 5. Passage of the new law dramatically changed Oregon’s property taxes, greatly reduced funding for many K-12 schools, and helped to eliminate several popular programs at the Oregon State University College of Liberal Arts. Following passage of the measure, specific schools in the college of liberal arts were targeted for elimination. 

Unrelated to passage of the measure, the University of Oregon's board of regents had a long, unsuccessful history of asking the Oregon State Board of Higher Education to eliminate OSU's technical journalism and broadcast media communications programs. The UO board believed they were "duplicative" of programs offered by their own university and made the request numerous times over the previous 70 years. Despite the pressure and claims, the faculty at the college of liberal arts was successful in maintaining both programs for decades, by ensuring their curriculums were distinct and missions uniquely different from similar programs offered by the University of Oregon. However, the 1991 state-wide budget cuts from passage of Measure 5 gave the board of higher education an opportunity to eliminate both programs, along with religious studies, while also satisfying the UO board of regents. Due to the Oregon State Board of Higher Education's new budgeting, the university's general fund appropriations fell from $117 million in fiscal 1992/93 to $101.2 million for the 1993/94 fiscal year. At the time the technical journalism program was eliminated, it was recognized as the fastest growing school on campus.

Since 2018, the college of liberal arts has offered a minor in applied journalism. The new digital communications arts major is also helping to fill the hole created by the loss of the technical journalism and broadcast media communications programs by introducing media students to the latest news and broadcasting software and technologies. The religious studies major is now available through the university's Ecampus.

Expansion
The college of liberal arts is scheduled to inherit a new, $75-million-dollar, center for the creative arts in 2023. The new addition will be named after donor, Patricia Valian Reser, and is planned for construction on campus at the corner of 15th and Washington Way.

According to the school of visual, performing and design arts, the 500-seat Patricia Valian Reser Center for the Creative Arts will serve as a performance center for all Oregonians and, more specifically, public school systems. One of the main goals of the center is to share art with students living throughout the state and allow them to experience art while visiting campus. 

A large stage is being designed to accommodate a range of performances, including everything from solo performances to concerts with 100-person choruses. Backstage and support areas will provide space for teaching, rehearsal and performance. Art gallery space will feature secure, dramatically lit spaces with appropriate climate control for displaying OSU's art collections and other cutting-edge art shows.

Notable alumni
 Brent Barry, NBA basketball executive, national sports broadcaster, former NBA player and two-time national champion, sociology, (1993–1995).
 John Brotherton, actor, played a leading role on the daytime drama One Life to Live, 2007–2010, part in Fuller House 2016–2018, theatre and fine arts (1989–?).   
 Pinto Colvig (Vance DeBar Colvig Sr.) voice acting pioneer at Disney Studios, journalism and art, (1910-1913)
 Geffrey Davis, American poet and professor, 2013 A. Poulin, Jr. Poetry Prize, Anne Halley Poetry Prize, Dogwood Prize in Poetry, Leonard Steinberg Memorial/Academy of American Poets Prize and the Wabash Prize for Poetry, English (2002–2006).
 Webley Edwards, World War II news correspondent & syndicated radio host (Hawaii Calls), journalism (?–1927).
 David Gilkey, photojournalist, NPR and Detroit Free Press, 2011 Peabody award, 2011 Edward R Murrow award, 2004 Michigan photographer of the year, 2010 George Polk Award, technical journalism (1986–1988).
 Kevin Hagen, actor, best known for role on Emmy Award-winning TV series Little House on the Prairie, political science (?).
 Christopher Howell, poet, National Endowment for the Arts fellow, English (1964–1968).
Lisa Jackson, national-bestselling author, her books appear on The New York Times, USA Today, and the Publishers Weekly national bestseller lists, English literature (1979-81).
 Harley Jessup, director of special effects, 1987 Best Visual Effects Oscar winner for the film Innerspace, graphic design (?–1976).
 Chris Johns, editor-in-chief of National Geographic magazine, technical journalism (1971–1974).
 Tala Madani, artist, Louis Comfort Tiffany Foundation (2013), Catherine Doctorow Prize for Contemporary Painting (2013), the De Volkskrant Art Award (2012), Pinchuk Art Centre (2012), political science and visual arts (2000–2004).
 Cathy Marshall, journalist, former CNN anchor, speech communications (1978–1982).
 Mike McMenamin, national craft brewer, Northwest restaurateur and hotel proprietor, manages 27 breweries, political science (1976–1980).
Frank Morse, former state senator, former president of one of Oregon's largest construction companies, general studies (MA) (1969-1970)
 George Oppen, winner of the 1969 Pulitzer Prize in poetry, English (1926–?).
 Mary Oppen, poet, English (1926–?).
 Deborah Reed, author, New York Times Best Selling Book "What the dog knows", English (1994–1997).
 Laurie Roth, nationally syndicated radio talk-show host and political commentator, 2012 presidential candidate, psychology (1991-95)
 Travis Rush, national recording artist/producer, owns Mason Records, liberal studies (?).
 Carl Salser, author, served on National Council on Educational Research, journalism (1922–1926).
 Jonathan Smith, head coach of Oregon State University Football, liberal studies, (1997-2001)
 Ernest H. Taves, psychiatrist and author, a scientific skeptic of UFO sightings, critic of Mormonism, science fiction writer, and former chief of US Army's neuropsychiatric section, philosophy (1933–1937)
 Mary Carlin Yates, federal appointee, Foreign Service Officer at the U.S. State Department and was one of two deputy commanders of the United States Africa Command until June 2009, English (1966–1969).

Notable faculty 
 Jon Franklin, journalist – Pulitzer prizes in journalism and science writing with the Baltimore Evening Sun, head of technical journalism school (1989–1991).
 Bernard Malamud, author – 1967 Pulitzer Prize for Fiction, most famous for writing The Natural, English (1949–1961).
 Ed McClanahan, novelist and short story writer – wrote for Esquire, Playboy and Rolling Stone. Received Playboy's award for nonfiction in 1972 and 1974, English (1958–1962). 
 Joseph Millar, poet – 2008 Pushcart Prize winner and Guggenheim Fellow, English, (?).
 Kathleen Dean Moore, philosopher, author and environmental activist – 2000 Sigurd Olson Nature Writing Award, for Holdfast, 1990 Choice Magazine, Outstanding Academic Book for Pardons, philosophy (1992–2013).
 Dana Reason, Canadian composer and recording artist, current assistant professor of contemporary music, school of arts and communication.
 William Appleman Williams, author of modern US history – regarded as a founder of the "revisionist school" of American diplomatic history and a prolific author, history (1968–1986).

References

External links
 

Liberal arts colleges at universities in the United States
Oregon State University
Liberal arts colleges in Oregon